The 1969 Men's World Weightlifting Championships were held in Warsaw, Poland from September 20 to September 28, 1969. There were 166 men from 37 nations in the competition.

Medal summary

Medal table

Ranking by Big (Total result) medals 

Ranking by all medals: Big (Total result) and Small (Press, Snatch and Clean & Jerk)

References
Results (Sport 123)
Weightlifting World Championships Seniors Statistics

External links
International Weightlifting Federation

World Weightlifting Championships
World Weightlifting Championships
World Weightlifting Championships
International weightlifting competitions hosted by Poland